Ernest Dewfall (12 August 1911 — 11 November 1982) was an English cricketer. He was a right-handed batsman and right-arm fast bowler who played for Gloucestershire. He was born in Long Ashton and died in Cleeve.

Dewfall made two first-class appearances for the side during the 1938 season. In his debut, against Surrey, he scored a duck in the only innings in which he batted, and took a single wicket with the ball, that of Eddie Watts.

Dewfall's second and final first-class appearance came against Nottinghamshire, in which, once again, he scored a duck in the only innings in which he batted, though he took three wickets with the ball, including that of Test cricketer Walter Keeton.

External links
Ernest Dewfall at Cricket Archive 

1911 births
1982 deaths
English cricketers
Gloucestershire cricketers
People from North Somerset (district)